The following is a list of awards and nominations received by Cynthia Erivo. She has won a Tony Award, Emmy Award, and a Grammy Award.

After her theatre debut in the early 2010s, Erivo garnered critical attention with her lead role in the Broadway revival of the musical The Color Purple, being awarded with a Tony Award, a Drama Desk Award and a Daytime Emmy Award. Thanks to The Color Purple's soundtrack from the stage production, she won a Grammy Award for Best Musical Theater Album in 2017. She later appeared as a guest in several television series and acted in Drew Goddard's neo-noir thriller film Bad Times at the El Royale, receiving a Saturn Awards nomination for her performance, and in critically acclaimed film Widows.

In 2019, Erivo gained national acclaim for her role in Kasi Lemmons's film Harriet, which gave her several accolades, including nominations at the Academy Awards, Golden Globe, Screen Actors Guild Awards and at the NAACP Image Awards. She also performed and co-wrote with Joshuah Brian Campbell Harriet's lead song "Stand Up", earning the Grammy award nomination for Best Song Written for Visual Media and for Best Original Song at both the Academy Award and the Golden Globe Award.

In 2020 Erivo starred in american miniseries The Outsider, being nominated to the Critics' Choice Television Awards and the Critics' Choice Super Awards. The following year she acted as Aretha Franklin in television series Genius: Aretha, receiving critical acclaim, with nominations at the Primetime Emmy Awards, the Golden Globe Awards, the Satellite Awards and the Screen Actors Guild Awards.

Major associations

Academy Awards

British Academy Film Awards

Emmy Awards (Daytime)

Emmy Awards (Primetime)

Golden Globe Awards

Grammy Awards

Screen Actors Guild Awards

Tony Awards

Other associations

BET Awards

Black Reel Awards

Critics' Choice Movie Awards

Critics' Choice Super Awards

Critics' Choice Television Awards

Drama Desk Award

Drama League Award

Hollywood Film Awards

Hollywood Music in Media Awards

NAACP Image Awards

Palm Springs International Film Festival

Theatre World Award

Santa Barbara International Film Festival Awards

Satellite Awards

Saturn Awards

Society of Composers and Lyricists Awards

WhatsOnStage Awards

World Soundtrack Awards

Critics Awards

Notes

References

External links
 

Erivo, Cynthia